Mucin-5B (MUC-5B) is a protein that in humans is encoded by the MUC5B gene
  and by Muc5b gene in mouse.  It is one of the five gel-forming mucins.  MUC-5B can be found in whole saliva, normal lung mucus, and cervical mucus. In some diseases such as COPD, chronic rhinosinusitis (CRS), and H. pylori-associated gastric disease.

Synthesis 
All mucins are synthesized in secretory cells known, dependent on the tissue they are located in, as goblet cells or mucous cells.  Their creation, while still not completely understood, begins in the endoplasmic reticulum.  From there, the Golgi apparatus build the O-linked glycans found in mucins.  Finally, they are packaged into secretory granules.

References 

05B